Sir Pratap Singh Nabha, KCSI (21 September 1919 – 22 July 1995) was the last ruling Maharaja of Nabha. The state of Nabha was merged into India in 1948. It was annexed to Patiala and the East Punjab States Union, a new political administrative unit that comprised all the states of the Punjab.

Early life

Singh was born in Nabha State in family, the eldest son and heir of Ripudaman Singh. At the age of eight, his father was deposed and Pratap Singh became the Maharaja. Pratap Singh began his schooling in the Anglo Indian school, Woodstock, in Musoorie. He was educated at the Royal Military Academy, Sandhurst and at Badingham College in Surrey.

Military Maharaja

After formally succeeding to the gadi in 1941, Pratap Singh was commissioned a Lieutenant in the British Indian Army and served in the Second World War. He was promoted to Captain in 1944, Lieutenant-Colonel in 1945 and Colonel in 1946. In 1946, he was knighted with the KCSI. 

Following Independence, he served as aide-de-camp to the President of India, as well as the head of the Sikh Regiment.

Later life

On 15 August 1947, Pratap Singh signed the Instrument of Accession to the Dominion of India and merged Nabha into PEPSU in 1948, from which point on he ceased to rule. In his later years, Singh served as President of the Wildlife Society of India as well as of the Vintage Car Association of India. He was stripped of his rank and titles by the Indira Gandhi government in 1971. Singh died in New Delhi on 22 July 1995.

Family

On 25 April 1944, Singh married Urmila Devi  (1924-1997), the only daughter of Rana Udaybhanu Singh. He had one daughter and three sons:
1. Sneh Lata Kaur  (1947-). Married the Maharaja of Orchha in 1971 and has one son and three daughters.
2. Hanuwant Singh (5 December 1948-), who succeeded to the throne as Maharaja of Nabha
3. Himmat Singh (1952-). Married a Nepalese princess in 1976 and has a son and daughter. Son named Kunwar BhanuPratap Singh, who married Rani Preeti Singh ( daughter of Chandroday Singh Parihar ) and has son named Kunwar Abhiudaypratap Singh.
4. Hemant Singh (1954-), who succeeded his maternal grandfather as Maharaj Rana of Dholpur.

Titles

1919-1928: Shri Tikka Sahib Pratap Singh
1928-1941: His Highness Farzand-i-Arjumand, Aqidat-Paiwand-i-Daulat-i-Inglishia, Barar Bans Sarmur, Raja-i-Rajagan, Maharaja Shri Pratap Singh Malvendra Bahadur, Maharaja of Nabha
1941-1944: Lieutenant His Highness Farzand-i-Arjumand, Aqidat-Paiwand-i-Daulat-i-Inglishia, Barar Bans Sarmur, Raja-i-Rajagan, Maharaja Shri Pratap Singh Malvendra Bahadur, Maharaja of Nabha 
1944-1945: Captain His Highness Farzand-i-Arjumand, Aqidat-Paiwand-i-Daulat-i-Inglishia, Barar Bans Sarmur, Raja-i-Rajagan, Maharaja Shri Pratap Singh Malvendra Bahadur, Maharaja of Nabha 
1945-1 January 1946: Lieutenant-Colonel His Highness Farzand-i-Arjumand, Aqidat-Paiwand-i-Daulat-i-Inglishia, Barar Bans Sarmur, Raja-i-Rajagan, Maharaja Shri Pratap Singh Malvendra Bahadur, Maharaja of Nabha 
1 January-15 October 1946: Lieutenant-Colonel His Highness Farzand-i-Arjumand, Aqidat-Paiwand-i-Daulat-i-Inglishia, Barar Bans Sarmur, Raja-i-Rajagan, Maharaja Shri Sir Pratap Singh Malvendra Bahadur, Maharaja of Nabha, KCSI
15 October 1946 – 1995: Colonel His Highness Farzand-i-Arjumand, Aqidat-Paiwand-i-Daulat-i-Inglishia, Barar Bans Sarmur, Raja-i-Rajagan, Maharaja Shri Sir Pratap Singh Malvendra Bahadur, Maharaja of Nabha, KCSI

Honours
(ribbon bar, as it would look today)

References

King George V Silver Jubilee Medal-1935
King George VI Coronation Medal-1937
1939-1945 Star-1945
War Medal 1939-1945-1945
India Service Medal-1945
Knight Commander of the Order of the Star of India (KCSI)-1946
Indian Independence Medal-1947

Knights Commander of the Order of the Star of India
1919 births
1995 deaths
Maharajas of Nabha
Indian knights
Indian expatriates in the United Kingdom
British Indian Army personnel
Indian military personnel of World War II